Natel Energy is an Alameda, California-based provider of low head hydro power systems. Since its founding in 2005, Natel has been awarded funding by the United States Department of Energy and Small Business Innovation Research Program to support commercialization of its technology, the hydroEngine.

Natel completed its first commercial installation in partnership with the Buckeye Water Conservation and Drainage District in Buckeye, Arizona, in early 2010.

References

External links
 Official website

Renewable energy technology companies
Engineering companies of the United States
Hydroelectricity in the United States